Ronald B. Gatski (January 10, 1935  April 6, 2017) was a Democratic member of the Pennsylvania House of Representatives.

References

Democratic Party members of the Pennsylvania House of Representatives
2017 deaths
1935 births
American politicians of Polish descent
Politicians from Hazleton, Pennsylvania